Gnetucleistol E is a stilbenoid found in the Chinese herb ''Gnetum cleistostachyum.

References 

Stilbenoids